Quezon is a province in the Philippines.

Quezon may also refer to:

People
 Manuel L. Quezon (1878–1944), president of the Philippines 1935–1944
 Aurora Quezon (1888–1949), his wife
 Manolo Quezon (born 1970), Filipino writer and television host

Places in the Philippines
 Quezon, Quezon, a municipality in the province of Quezon
 Quezon City, a highly urbanized city in Metro Manila
 Quezon, Bukidnon, a municipality
 Quezon, Isabela, a municipality
 Quezon, Nueva Ecija, a municipality
 Quezon, Nueva Vizcaya, a municipality
 Quezon, Palawan, a municipality

Other uses
BRP Quezon (PS-70), a ship of the Philippine Navy

See also